This is a list of medalists from the World Orienteering Championships in men's orienteering.

Individual/Classic/Long Distance
This event was called "Individual" from 1966 to 1989 and "Classic distance" from 1991 to 2001. Since 2003 it is called "Long distance".

Short/Middle Distance
This event was first held in 1991. The format was changed and renamed "Middle Distance" in 2003 with the introduction of the Sprint discipline.

Sprint
This event was first held in 2001.

Knock-out Sprint
This event was first held in 2022.

Relay

2009 Note: In the 3rd leg Martin Johansson (Sweden) was in the lead when he suffered a serious injury;  Thierry Gueorgiou (France), Anders Nordberg (Norway), and Michal Smola (Czech Republic) gave up their lead positions and rescued him. Interpretation of International Orienteering Federation (IOF) competition rules was at issue: rule 26.13 states "The organiser must void a competition if at any point it becomes clear that circumstances have arisen which make the competition unfair or dangerous for the competitors." After much deliberation on whether or not to void the relay, the organizers declared that it stood.

Medal table
Table updated after the 2019 Championships.

Multiple medalists

Best performers by country 
Including mixed events 

An asterisk (*) marks athletes who are the only representatives of their respective countries to win a medal.

References

External links
 International Orienteering Federation
 World Orienteering Championships, senior statistics 1966–2005

medalists